Johann Gottlieb Graun (1702/1703 – 28 October 1771) was a German Baroque/Classical era composer and violinist, born in Wahrenbrück. His brother Carl Heinrich was a singer and also a composer, and is the better known of the two.

Johann Gottlieb studied with J.G. Pisendel in Dresden and Giuseppe Tartini in Padua. Appointed Konzertmeister in Merseburg in 1726, he taught the violin to J.S. Bach's son Wilhelm Friedemann. He joined the court of the Prussian crown prince (the future Frederick the Great) in 1732. Graun was later made Konzertmeister of the Berlin Opera in 1740. He composed over 50 songs and compositions.

Graun's compositions were highly respected, and continued to be performed after his death: "The concert-master, John Gottlib Graun, brother to the opera-composer, his admirers say, 'was one of the greatest performers on the violin of his time, and most assuredly, a composer of the first rank'," wrote Charles Burney. He was primarily known for his instrumental works, though he also wrote vocal music and operas. He wrote a large number of violin concertos, trio sonatas, and solo sonatas for violin with cembalo, as well as two string quartets — among the earliest attempts in this genre. He also wrote many concertos for viola da gamba, which were very virtuosic, and were played by Ludwig Christian Hesse, considered the leading gambist of the time.

Despite the popularity of his works, Graun was not free from criticism. Burney noted that some critics complained that, "In his concertos and church music ... the length of each movement is more immoderate than Christian patience can endure."

Selected recordings
Concerti & Sinfonie Wiener Akademie, dir. Martin Haselböck cpo

References

External links

1703 births
1771 deaths
People from Uebigau-Wahrenbrück
People from the Electorate of Saxony
German Baroque composers
German Classical-period composers
German male classical composers
18th-century classical composers
18th-century German composers
18th-century German male musicians
People educated at the Kreuzschule
Pupils of Giuseppe Tartini